Dakhrajin (also Romanized as Dākhrajīn and Dakharjīn) is a village in Abgarm Rural District, Abgarm District, Avaj County, Qazvin Province, Iran. At the 2006 census, its population was 562, in 135 families.

References 

Populated places in Avaj County